Kaaval Nilayam is a 1991 Tamil language crime film directed by Senthilnathan. The film stars Sarathkumar and Anandaraj. It was released on 11 May 1991.

Plot

Raja, a rowdy, escapes from police officers and he is accommodated by a prostitute. Vijay, an honest police officer, is transferred to a new area. Vijay lives happily with his wife Aarthi and his daughter Sowmiya. Soon, Raja crosses Vijay's path.

In the past, Raja and Vijay were friends. Raja, Vijay and Aarthi trained hard for becoming police officers. While Raja was an orphan, Vijay was from a police family. The honest police officer Ravi, Vijay's brother, clashed with the corrupt politician Andhavar and he was killed by Andhavar. Andhavar's son is involved in drugging and filming young women.
Vijay and Raja took different ways to fight against Andhavar.

Cast

Sarath Kumar as Inspector Vijay
Anandaraj as Raja
M. N. Nambiar as Andhavar
Gautami as Aarthi
Jaishankar as Ravi
K. R. Vijaya as Ravi's wife
Janagaraj as Murali
Senthil as Harichandran
Senthilnathan
Charuhasan
V. Gopalakrishnan as D.G.P Gopalakrishnan
Delhi Ganesh
Shanmugasundaram
Krishnamoorthy
Ajay Rathnam as Andhavar's son
Jacky
Idichapuli Selvaraj as Selvaraj
M.L.A Thangaraj as Pichakannu
Kamala Kamesh as Murali's mother
Baby Sowmiya as Sowmiya
Aandal

Soundtrack

The music was by Shankar–Ganesh, with lyrics written by Vaali, Muthulingam, Piraisoodan and Shankar–Ganesh.

References

External links

1990s Tamil-language films
1991 films
Films directed by Senthilnathan
Fictional portrayals of the Tamil Nadu Police
Films scored by Shankar–Ganesh